First Kiss is the tenth studio album by American singer and songwriter Kid Rock. The album was released on February 24, 2015, through Warner Bros. Records and Top Dog Records, and is his first and only with Warner Bros. after leaving sister label Atlantic Records in 2014.

Critical reception

First Kiss received mixed reviews from music critics. At Metacritic, which assigns a normalized rating out of 100 to reviews from critics, the album received an average score of 61, which indicates "generally favorable reviews", based on 9 reviews. Stephen Thomas Erlewine of AllMusic said, "It's a bit bumpy and sometimes sleepy but it finds old Bob Ritchie settling into his comfort zone, knowing that he's in it for the long haul." Anthony DeCurtis of Rolling Stone said, "First Kiss presents few surprises, mostly because Kid Rock's journey from abrasive rap metal to unreconstructed heartland rock has landed him in a sweet spot: big guitars, big drums, big choruses and gravelly vocals." Richard Bienstock of Billboard said, "First Kiss is hardly his most adventurous project, but it is perhaps his most easygoing, tuneful one. The production is crisp and clean, the guitars are sparkling, the vibe is rollicking but relaxed. He sounds better here than he has in a long time."

Commercial performance
The album debuted at number two on the Billboard 200, with sales of 137,000 copies in the United States. As of December 2015, First Kiss has sold more than 354,000 copies in the United States. The album also debuted at number two in Canada on the Canadian Albums Chart, with sales of 8,000.

Track listing
All songs were produced by Kid Rock, except "First Kiss" and "Drinking Beer With Dad" were produced by Kid Rock and Dan Huff.

Personnel

Kid Rock
Robert James Ritchie Sr. - drum programming, drums, acoustic guitar, electric guitar, keyboards, percussion, piano, shaker, synthesizer, tambourine, background vocals, wah wah guitar

Additional personnel

Hornists
Rayse Biggs - horns
Dave McMurray - horns

Backing vocalists
Barbara Payton - background vocals
Herschel Boone - background vocals
Jessica Wagner-Cowan - background vocals
Laura Creamer - background vocals
Russell Terrell - background vocals
Shannon Curfman - background vocals
Shaun Murphy - background vocals
Stacy Michelle - background vocals

Drummers
Dorian Crozier
Richard Millsap

Others
Jimmie Bones - piano, background vocals
Rob Mathes - conductor, string arrangements
Larry Franklin - fiddle
David Huff - drum programming
Marlon Young - bass guitar, acoustic guitar, electric guitar

Guitarists
Dan Dugmore - steel guitar
Dann Huff - acoustic guitar, electric guitar, mandolin
Ed Jurdi - electric guitar, slide guitar
Gordy Quist - electric guitar
Adam Shoenfeld - electric guitar
Nathan Young - electric guitar

Pianists
Charlie Judge - accordion, organ, piano
Trevor Nealon - organ, piano, electric piano

Violists
Vivek Kamath - viola
Shmuel Katz 
Remi Pelletier

Violinists
Larry Frautchi - violin
Lisa Kim - violin
Hyunju Lee - violin
Liz Kim - violin
Joanna Maurer - violin
Annaliesa Place - violin
Sharon Yamada - violin
Jung Sun Yoo - violin
Suzanne Ornstein - violin
David Southern - violin

Cellists
Mihai Marica - cello
Alan Stepansky - cello
Wendy Sutter - cello

Bassists
Jimmie Lee Sloas - bass guitar
Darrel "Peanut" Smith - bass guitar

Charts

Weekly charts

Year-end charts

References

2015 albums
Blues albums by American artists
Country albums by American artists
Rock-and-roll albums
Swamp rock albums
Kid Rock albums
Warner Records albums